This is a list of record home attendances of English football clubs. It lists the highest attendance of all English Non League, Football League and Premier League clubs, for a home match above a highest attendance of 5,000. It is noticeable that a large proportion of records were set at matches in the FA Cup.

Ground capacities have declined for many clubs since all-seater stadia were introduced in the late 1980s, especially at older grounds, with many records set at the terraced stadia, with their high standing capacities, that were replaced. In several cases records were achieved at a former ground rather than the club's current location. For example, Wigan Athletic's record was set at Springfield Park, not their current home, the DW Stadium.

The record home attendance for five clubs occurred away from their usual home grounds. Manchester United's record home attendance was set at Maine Road, the home of neighbours Manchester City, during a period when United's Old Trafford was being rebuilt following bomb damage sustained during the Second World War. During the 1998–99 season Arsenal played their UEFA Champions League home matches at Wembley, with the 73,707 attendance against Lens exceeding the record for Highbury and Tottenham Hotspur also played their UEFA Champions League games at Wembley Stadium in the 2016–17 season. Similarly, Accrington Stanley's record home attendance was set when the club played an FA Cup home tie at Blackburn's Ewood Park instead of their usual home (the Crown Ground) and Stevenage's record was set when the club played a "home" FA Cup tie against Birmingham City at Birmingham's St Andrew's ground.

List 
Records correct as of 23 March 2018. Italics denote attendance record set at ground not designated as usual home ground; Bold denote attendance record set at current ground.

Footnotes

References

English football club statistics
A
England